Akonga Nsimbo (born 9 January 1979) is a Congolese sprinter. She competed in the women's 100 metres at the 2000 Summer Olympics.

References

External links
 

1979 births
Living people
Athletes (track and field) at the 2000 Summer Olympics
Democratic Republic of the Congo female sprinters
Olympic athletes of the Democratic Republic of the Congo
Place of birth missing (living people)
Olympic female sprinters
21st-century Democratic Republic of the Congo people